Cheddar Gorgeous is the stage name of Michael Atkins, an English drag performer who competed on the fourth series of RuPaul's Drag Race UK, where they finished as the runner-up.  They have previously appeared on Drag SOS.

Cheddar Gorgeous was born in Birmingham and now lives in Manchester. Their drag name comes from the landmark Cheddar Gorge.

Atkins holds a PhD in Anthropology from the University of Manchester.

Discography

References

Year of birth missing (living people)
Living people
20th-century English LGBT people
21st-century English LGBT people
English drag queens
People from Birmingham, West Midlands
People from Manchester
RuPaul's Drag Race UK contestants
Alumni of the University of Manchester